Humboldt—Melfort (also known as Humboldt—Melfort—Tisdale) was a federal electoral district in Saskatchewan, Canada, that was represented in the House of Commons of Canada from 1952 to 1968. This riding was created in 1952 from parts of Humboldt, Melfort and Yorkton ridings. In 1961, the riding was renamed "Humboldt—Melfort—Tisdale".

The riding was abolished in 1966 when it was redistributed into Mackenzie, Prince Albert, Regina East, Regina—Lake Centre and Saskatoon—Humboldt ridings.

Election results

See also 

 List of Canadian federal electoral districts
 Past Canadian electoral districts

External links 
 
 

Former federal electoral districts of Saskatchewan